The Hurez is a left tributary of the river Ciolt in Romania. It flows into the Ciolt near Chisindia.

References

Rivers of Romania
Rivers of Arad County